WHO Expert Committee on Leprosy is constituted by World Health Organization to study the worldwide progress of Leprosy.

Reports
 First report published as Technical Report Series No. 71 in 1954.
 Second report published as Technical Report Series No. 189 in 1960.
 Third report published as Technical Report Series No. 319 in 1966.
 Fourth report published as Technical Report Series No. 459 in 1970.
 Fifth report published as Technical Report Series No. 607 in 1977.
 Sixth report published as Technical Report Series No. 768 in 1988.
 Seventh report published as Technical Report Series No. 874 in 1998. They concluded that a single dose of a combination of rifampicin, ofloxacin and minocycline is an acceptable and cost-effective alternative regimen for the treatment of single-lesion paucibacillary leprosy and the duration of the standard regimen for multibacillary leprosy could be shortened to 12 months.

References

World Health Organization
Leprosy organizations